The Braille pattern dots-1234 is a 6-dot braille cell with both top and all left-side dots raised, or an 8-dot braille cell with both top and both middle-left dots raised. It is represented by the Unicode code point U+280f, and in Braille ASCII with P.

Unified Braille

In unified international braille, the braille pattern dots-1234 is used to represent a voiceless bilabial plosive, ie /p/.

Table of unified braille values

Other braille

Plus dots 7 and 8

Related to Braille pattern dots-1234 are Braille patterns 12347, 12348, and 123478, which are used in 8-dot braille systems, such as Gardner-Salinas and Luxembourgish Braille.

Related 8-dot kantenji patterns

In the Japanese kantenji braille, the standard 8-dot Braille patterns 2357, 12357, 23457, and 123457 are the patterns related to Braille pattern dots-1234, since the two additional dots of kantenji patterns 01234, 12347, and 012347 are placed above the base 6-dot cell, instead of below, as in standard 8-dot braille.

Kantenji using braille patterns 2357, 12357, 23457, or 123457

This listing includes kantenji using Braille pattern dots-1234 for all 6349 kanji found in JIS C 6226-1978.

  - 示

Variants and thematic compounds

  -  selector 1 + ね/示  =  衷
  -  selector 3 + ね/示  =  幵
  -  selector 4 + ね/示  =  剣
  -  selector 1 + selector 4 + ね/示  =  剱
  -  selector 4 + selector 4 + ね/示  =  劍
  -  selector 5 + selector 4 + ね/示  =  劔
  -  selector 6 + selector 4 + ね/示  =  劒
  -  ね/示 + selector 1  =  衣
  -  ね/示 + selector 4  =  袖

Compounds of 示

  -  う/宀/#3 + ね/示  =  宗
  -  や/疒 + ね/示  =  崇
  -  心 + う/宀/#3 + ね/示  =  棕
  -  に/氵 + う/宀/#3 + ね/示  =  淙
  -  の/禾 + う/宀/#3 + ね/示  =  粽
  -  い/糹/#2 + う/宀/#3 + ね/示  =  綜
  -  み/耳 + う/宀/#3 + ね/示  =  踪
  -  に/氵 + ね/示  =  票
  -  ぬ/力 + に/氵 + ね/示  =  剽
  -  ふ/女 + に/氵 + ね/示  =  嫖
  -  る/忄 + に/氵 + ね/示  =  慓
  -  心 + に/氵 + ね/示  =  瓢
  -  い/糹/#2 + に/氵 + ね/示  =  縹
  -  む/車 + に/氵 + ね/示  =  飄
  -  そ/馬 + に/氵 + ね/示  =  驃
  -  せ/食 + に/氵 + ね/示  =  鰾
  -  き/木 + ね/示  =  禁
  -  れ/口 + き/木 + ね/示  =  噤
  -  ね/示 + き/木 + ね/示  =  襟
  -  ね/示 + さ/阝  =  祭
  -  ね/示 + て/扌  =  擦
  -  く/艹 + ね/示 + さ/阝  =  蔡
  -  ね/示 + 仁/亻  =  祠
  -  ね/示 + ゑ/訁  =  祓
  -  と/戸 + ね/示  =  尉
  -  火 + と/戸 + ね/示  =  熨
  -  く/艹 + と/戸 + ね/示  =  蔚
  -  ん/止 + ね/示  =  款
  -  ね/示 + ゆ/彳  =  隷
  -  ね/示 + ね/示 + ゆ/彳  =  隸
  -  ね/示 + 比 + へ/⺩  =  祟
  -  ね/示 + 囗 + れ/口  =  禀
  -  ね/示 + ゆ/彳 + さ/阝  =  禦
  -  心 + 宿 + ね/示  =  蒜
  -  ね/示 + ね/示 + ゆ/彳  =  隸
  -  ね/示 + 宿 + お/頁  =  頴
  -  ね/示 + ぬ/力  =  初
  -  ね/示 + ぬ/力 + け/犬  =  禊
  -  ね/示 + と/戸  =  礼
  -  ね/示 + つ/土  =  社
  -  ね/示 + つ/土 + 囗  =  禧
  -  ね/示 + つ/土 + つ/土  =  褂
  -  ね/示 + つ/土 + れ/口  =  襭
  -  ね/示 + を/貝  =  祈
  -  ね/示 + ん/止  =  祉
  -  ね/示 + 数  =  祐
  -  ね/示 + そ/馬  =  祖
  -  ね/示 + 宿  =  祝
  -  ね/示 + し/巿  =  神
  -  心 + ね/示 + し/巿  =  榊
  -  せ/食 + ね/示 + し/巿  =  鰰
  -  ね/示 + 龸  =  祢
  -  ね/示 + ね/示 + 龸  =  袮
  -  ね/示 + よ/广  =  祥
  -  ね/示 + へ/⺩  =  祷
  -  ね/示 + み/耳  =  禄
  -  ね/示 + ね/示 + み/耳  =  祿
  -  ね/示 + れ/口  =  禅
  -  ね/示 + ね/示 + れ/口  =  禪
  -  ね/示 + れ/口 + れ/口  =  襌
  -  ね/示 + か/金  =  禍
  -  ね/示 + ふ/女  =  福
  -  ね/示 + 日  =  衿
  -  ね/示 + ひ/辶  =  被
  -  ね/示 + た/⽥  =  裕
  -  ね/示 + ほ/方  =  補
  -  ね/示 + き/木  =  裸
  -  ね/示 + す/発  =  複
  -  ね/示 + む/車  =  褌
  -  ね/示 + 氷/氵  =  褐
  -  ね/示 + め/目  =  視
  -  ね/示 + ね/示 + と/戸  =  禮
  -  ね/示 + 宿 + き/木  =  祀
  -  ね/示 + 龸 + さ/阝  =  祁
  -  ね/示 + selector 1 + ん/止  =  祇
  -  ね/示 + 宿 + ん/止  =  祗
  -  ね/示 + 宿 + さ/阝  =  祚
  -  ね/示 + selector 4 + き/木  =  祺
  -  ね/示 + を/貝 + と/戸  =  禎
  -  ね/示 + 龸 + た/⽥  =  禝
  -  ね/示 + 囗 + め/目  =  禰
  -  ね/示 + 宿 + み/耳  =  禳
  -  ね/示 + 宿 + う/宀/#3  =  衫
  -  ね/示 + 囗 + 仁/亻  =  衲
  -  ね/示 + 宿 + 日  =  衵
  -  ね/示 + 数 + に/氵  =  衽
  -  ね/示 + 宿 + て/扌  =  袂
  -  ね/示 + も/門 + selector 2  =  袍
  -  ね/示 + selector 4 + 日  =  袒
  -  ね/示 + う/宀/#3 + う/宀/#3  =  袗
  -  ね/示 + 日 + selector 1  =  袙
  -  ね/示 + ろ/十 + は/辶  =  袢
  -  ね/示 + な/亻 + け/犬  =  袱
  -  ね/示 + 宿 + け/犬  =  袴
  -  ね/示 + 仁/亻 + に/氵  =  袵
  -  ね/示 + り/分 + 囗  =  袷
  -  ね/示 + 宿 + つ/土  =  袿
  -  ね/示 + う/宀/#3 + 龸  =  裃
  -  ね/示 + 宿 + ゆ/彳  =  裄
  -  ね/示 + お/頁 + selector 1  =  裙
  -  ね/示 + 比 + り/分  =  裡
  -  ね/示 + た/⽥ + さ/阝  =  裨
  -  ね/示 + ち/竹 + selector 4  =  裲
  -  ね/示 + 日 + 数  =  裼
  -  ね/示 + と/戸 + selector 1  =  裾
  -  ね/示 + ふ/女 + さ/阝  =  褄
  -  ね/示 + 宿 + へ/⺩  =  褊
  -  ね/示 + な/亻 + れ/口  =  褓
  -  ね/示 + 宿 + れ/口  =  褝
  -  ね/示 + 宿 + ⺼  =  褞
  -  ね/示 + し/巿 + ろ/十  =  褥
  -  ね/示 + ひ/辶 + や/疒  =  褪
  -  ね/示 + す/発 + selector 3  =  褫
  -  ね/示 + む/車 + 日  =  褶
  -  ね/示 + 宿 + る/忄  =  褸
  -  ね/示 + ゆ/彳 + む/車  =  襁
  -  ね/示 + き/木 + い/糹/#2  =  襍
  -  ね/示 + 囗 + の/禾  =  襖
  -  ね/示 + 龸 + ふ/女  =  襠
  -  ね/示 + す/発 + ⺼  =  襤
  -  ね/示 + ち/竹 + の/禾  =  襦
  -  ね/示 + す/発 + ひ/辶  =  襪
  -  ね/示 + ま/石 + め/目  =  襯
  -  ね/示 + も/門 + ひ/辶  =  襴
  -  ね/示 + う/宀/#3 + て/扌  =  襷

Compounds of 刂 and 力

  -  は/辶 + ね/示  =  判
  -  れ/口 + ね/示  =  別
  -  て/扌 + れ/口 + ね/示  =  捌
  -  め/目 + ね/示  =  刹
  -  ゐ/幺 + ね/示  =  刻
  -  囗 + ね/示  =  剛
  -  さ/阝 + ね/示  =  剤
  -  さ/阝 + さ/阝 + ね/示  =  劑
  -  の/禾 + ね/示  =  剰
  -  の/禾 + の/禾 + ね/示  =  剩
  -  そ/馬 + ね/示  =  劇
  -  す/発 + ね/示  =  罰
  -  け/犬 + 宿 + ね/示  =  剄
  -  ね/示 + か/金 + き/木  =  剿
  -  け/犬 + ね/示  =  勧
  -  け/犬 + け/犬 + ね/示  =  勸
  -  ⺼ + ね/示  =  脇

Compounds of 衷

  -  龸 + ね/示  =  哀
  -  ろ/十 + ね/示  =  喪
  -  宿 + ね/示  =  衰
  -  き/木 + 宿 + ね/示  =  榱
  -  く/艹 + 宿 + ね/示  =  蓑
  -  ち/竹 + 宿 + ね/示  =  簑
  -  ち/竹 + 龸 + ね/示  =  簔

Compounds of 幵

  -  ふ/女 + ね/示  =  妍
  -  ま/石 + ね/示  =  研
  -  ね/示 + ね/示  =  刑
  -  心 + ね/示 + ね/示  =  荊
  -  ね/示 + う/宀/#3  =  形
  -  き/木 + selector 3 + ね/示  =  枅

Compounds of 衣

  -  み/耳 + ね/示  =  裁
  -  ほ/方 + ね/示  =  裂
  -  つ/土 + ね/示  =  装
  -  つ/土 + つ/土 + ね/示  =  裝
  -  り/分 + ね/示  =  裏
  -  せ/食 + ね/示  =  製
  -  ね/示 + な/亻  =  依
  -  ね/示 + ろ/十  =  嚢
  -  ね/示 + 囗  =  袋
  -  ね/示 + え/訁  =  裔
  -  ね/示 + 心  =  襲
  -  へ/⺩ + ね/示  =  表
  -  仁/亻 + ね/示  =  俵
  -  た/⽥ + ね/示  =  畏
  -  た/⽥ + ね/示 + selector 1  =  畩
  -  宿 + ね/示 + selector 1  =  袞
  -  龸 + ね/示 + selector 1  =  褻
  -  ね/示 + selector 1 + よ/广  =  袤
  -  ね/示 + り/分 + selector 1  =  衾
  -  ね/示 + ぬ/力 + れ/口  =  袈
  -  ね/示 + 比 + は/辶  =  袰
  -  ね/示 + ろ/十 + に/氵  =  裘
  -  ね/示 + 氷/氵 + ほ/方  =  裟
  -  ね/示 + selector 6 + は/辶  =  裳
  -  ね/示 + selector 4 + 火  =  裴
  -  ね/示 + た/⽥ + き/木  =  裹
  -  ね/示 + 宿 + ま/石  =  襞

Other compounds

  -  日 + ね/示  =  昔
  -  な/亻 + ね/示  =  借
  -  る/忄 + ね/示  =  惜
  -  て/扌 + ね/示  =  措
  -  か/金 + ね/示  =  錯
  -  ち/竹 + ね/示  =  籍
  -  く/艹 + 日 + ね/示  =  藉
  -  せ/食 + 日 + ね/示  =  醋
  -  ね/示 + 宿 + せ/食  =  鵲

Notes

Braille patterns